"Congratulations" is a song by American rapper and singer Post Malone featuring fellow American rapper and singer Quavo. It was released through Republic Records on January 31, 2017, as the fifth single from Malone's debut studio album, Stoney (2016). At first, was released as a promotional single from the album on November 4, 2016. It was then released on January 31, 2017, as the fifth official single from the album. Malone and Quavo wrote the song with Carl Rosen and producers Metro Boomin, Frank Dukes, and Louis Bell. A remix, which includes an additional feature from fellow American rapper Future, was released on June 16, 2017.

Background
Producers Frank Dukes, Metro Boomin, and Louis Bell began working with Post Malone on tracks for his debut album after the success of the single "White Iverson." During the writing process, they were watching the 2016 Summer Olympics and were inspired to create a triumphant song. At one point during the session, Post's manager Dre London shouted 'congratulations,' inspiring the chorus of the song.

Post Malone debuted the track while performing in Austin, Texas in September 2016, two months before the song's official release.

On May 9, 2017, the track was performed to Post Malone by a mariachi band, commissioned by Indonesian rapper Rich Brian.

On June 16, 2017, the official remix was released featuring an additional verse from Future.

Composition
The song is written in the key of F♯ major with a tempo of 110 beats per minute.

Music video
The song's accompanying music video premiered on January 23, 2017, on Post Malone's Vevo account on YouTube. The music video was directed by James DeFina. It features cameo appearances from Murda Beatz, Metro Boomin, Frank Dukes, and fellow members of the Migos crew. , the music video has been viewed over 1.3 billion times.

Chart performance
The song peaked at number eight on the US Billboard Hot 100, becoming Post Malone's second top 20 hit, following his debut single, "White Iverson", and first top 10 hit, and has spent a total of 50 weeks on the chart. The song was later certified Diamond (11× Platinum) by the Recording Industry Association of America (RIAA) for combined sales and streaming equivalent units of over 11 million units in the United States.

Personnel 
Adapted from TIDAL.

Production

 Frank Dukes – production, songwriting; programming
 Metro Boomin – production, songwriting; programming
 Louis Bell – additional production, songwriting
 Post Malone – songwriting; vocals
 Carl Rosen – songwriting
 Quavo – songwriting; vocals

Technical

 Frank Dukes – recording
 Louis Bell – recording
 Manny Marroquin – mixing
 Chris Galland – assistant mixer
 Jeff Jackson – assistant mixer

Charts

Weekly charts

Year-end charts

Certifications

Release history

Notes

References

2017 singles
2016 songs
Republic Records singles
Post Malone songs
Songs written by Metro Boomin
Songs written by Frank Dukes
Song recordings produced by Metro Boomin
Songs written by Quavo
Songs written by Post Malone
Songs written by Louis Bell
Quavo songs
Song recordings produced by Frank Dukes
Song recordings produced by Louis Bell